My Tiny Terror is an American reality television series that premiered on Animal Planet on May 30, 2014.

It premiered in Australia on April 5, 2015, on the Australian Animal Planet.

References

2014 American television series debuts
Animal Planet original programming